Caught the Blast is the first full-length album by Minnesota-based indie rock band Party of One, released on May 27, 2003 on FatCat Records.

Critical reception

Negative
Many reviewers, such as those writing for Allmusic and Pitchfork, gave Caught The Blast negative reviews upon its release. For example, Allmusic reviewer Andy Kellman wrote that the album "probably sounds great to anyone who has never heard a Dischord release with a copyright date earlier than 1995," and Pitchfork Media's Michael Idov wrote that "every note produced by every instrument on Caught the Blast has been meticulously designed to suck."

Positive
This album did receive some positive reviews, however, including one from Robert Christgau, who wrote that "...like so many lo-fi note-missers of enduring social value, they're winningly enthusiastic about their own negativity." Terry Sawyer of PopMatters said in 2003 that Caught the Blast was "one of the best records I've heard this year," and after attending a live show where Party of One performed, described Fifteen's stage presence as "petulantly misanthropic." Seattle Weekly's Rod Smith wrote that "[Fifteen's] refusal to wax sanctimonious or get flinchy in even the ugliest situations is part of why Fifteen's party runs so well." Another positive review of this album came from the Washington City Paper, where Andrew Beaujon wrote that it was "...the most fun, most disconcerting way to amuse yourself since the BBC's The League of Gentlemen," and their single "Snap You Like a Twig," the lead track on Caught the Blast, received a positive review from Drowned in Sound, where "Shoo" wrote that the song was "an expansive track oblique with orphaned emotion, latent suggestions of insurrection, loss, crushing defeats, sexual recklessness, domination, upside-down worldview." In The Washington Post, Mark Jenkins wrote that "Many of the album's tracks are basically folk-blues laments, but they're set to percolating rhythms and updated with unexpected asides..."

Track listing
Snap You Like a Twig
Six Million Anonymous Deceased
Scorch the Brainwave
Belgrade Sends its Regards
Shotgun Funeral
Synagogue Chamber Waltz
Midnight Gypsy
Baghdad Boogie
Fine Line Between Us
Slide Away
Baby Doll
Shock to the System

Personnel
Eric Fifteen—Lead vocals, songwriting
Terrika Kleinknecht—Bass guitar
Geoff McKusick—Drums

References

2003 debut albums
FatCat Records albums
Party of One albums